Karpuzlu railway station is a stop on the Torbalı-Ödemiş railway. The Turkish State Railways operates two regional services from Izmir to Ödemiş and Tire with ten daily trains in each direction. Karpuzlu was built in 1883 by the Oriental Railway Company and taken over by the state railways in 1935.

References

External links
Turkish State Railways official site

Railway stations opened in 1883
1883 establishments in the Ottoman Empire